The 4 x 100 metres relay at the 1983 World Championships in Athletics was held at the Helsinki Olympic Stadium on August 9 and August 10.

Medals

Records
Existing records at the start of the event.

Results

Heats
All times shown are in seconds.

Heat 1
 (Andreas Knebel, Thomas Schröder, Jens Hübler, Frank Emmelmann) 39.22 Q
 (Krasimir Sarbakov, Yordan Vandov, Bogomil Karadimov, Valentin Atanasov) 39.55 Q
 (Ainsley Bennett, Donovan Reid, Mike McFarlane, Drew McMaster) 39.56 Q
 (Innocent Egbunike, Ikpoto Eseme, Samson Oyeledun, Chidi Imoh) 39.62 Q
 (Jouko Lehtinen, Jouko Hassi, Jukka Sihvonen, Kimmo Saaristo) 39.65 q
 (Fabian Whymns, Austin Albury, Joey Wells, David Charlton) 39.91 q
 (Ernest Obeng, Sam Aidoo, Edward Pappoe, Awudu Nuhu) 41.92
 DNS

Heat 2
 (Emmit King, Willie Gault, Calvin Smith, Carl Lewis) 38.75 Q
 (Stefano Tilli, Carlo Simionato, Pierfrancesco Pavoni, Pietro Mennea) 39.40 Q
 (Ferenc Kiss, István Nagy, László Babály, István Tatár) 39.58 Q
 (Paul Narracott, Gerrard Keating, Bruce Frayne, Gary Minihan) 40.02 Q
 (Otokpa Kouadio, Avognan Nogboum, Georges Kablan Degnan, Gabriel Tiacoh) 40.70
 (Wang Shaoming, He Baodang, Cai Jianming, Yan Guoqiang) DQ
 (Ben Johnson, Atlee Mahorn, Desai Williams, Tony Sharpe) DQ
 (Alfred Nyambane Johnson, Peter Wekesa, John Anzrah, Moja Shivanda) DQ

Heat 3
 (Andrey Prokofyev, Nikolay Sidorov, Vladimir Muravyov, Viktor Bryzgin) 38.77 Q
 (Thierry Francois, Marc Gasparoni, Antoine Richard, Jean-Jacques Boussemart) 39.17 Q
 (Werner Bastians, Christian Haas, Jürgen Evers, Andreas Rizzi) 39.35 Q
 (Krzysztof Zwoliński, Zenon Licznerski, Czesław Prądzyński, Marian Woronin) 39.41 Q
 (George Walcott, Ray Stewart, Leroy Reid, Colin Bradford) 39.49 q
 (Angelos Angelidis, Theodoros Gatzios, Nikos Hadjinicolaou, Kosmas Stratos) 39.85 q
 (Somsak Boontad, Suchart Chairsuvaparb, Prasit Boomprasert, Sumet Promna) 40.17
 (Wu Jing-Yee, Lee Kuo-Sheng, Hwang Chian-Shin, Hwang Sheng-Tai) 40.49

Semi-finals

Heat 1
 (Andrey Prokofyev, Nikolay Sidorov, Vladimir Muravyov, Viktor Bryzgin) 38.62 Q
 (Stefano Tilli, Carlo Simionato, Pierfrancesco Pavoni, Pietro Mennea) 38.74 Q
 (Krzysztof Zwoliński, Zenon Licznerski, Czesław Prądzyński, Marian Woronin) 39.01 Q
 (Thierry Francois, Marc Gasparoni, Antoine Richard, Jean-Jacques Boussemart) 39.14 Q
 (Innocent Egbunike, Ikpoto Eseme, Samson Oyeledun, Chidi Imoh) 39.44
 (Angelos Angelidis, Theodoros Gatzios, Nikos Hadjinicolaou, Kosmas Stratos) 39.71
 (Jouko Lehtinen, Jouko Hassi, Jukka Sihvonen, Kimmo Saaristo) 40.02
 (Ferenc Kiss, István Nagy, László Babály, István Tatár) DNF

Heat 2
 (Emmit King, Willie Gault, Calvin Smith, Carl Lewis) 38.50 Q
 (Andreas Knebel, Thomas Schröder, Jens Hübler, Frank Emmelmann) 38.95 Q
 (Werner Bastians, Christian Haas, Jürgen Evers, Andreas Rizzi) 39.13 Q
 (George Walcott, Ray Stewart, Leroy Reid, Colin Bradford) 39.18 Q
 (Ainsley Bennett, Donovan Reid, Mike McFarlane, Drew McMaster) 39.39
 (Krasimir Sarbakov, Yordan Vandov, Bogomil Karadimov, Valentin Atanasov) 39.59
 (Fabian Whymns, Austin Albury, Joey Wells, David Charlton) 40.52
 (Paul Narracott, Gerrard Keating, Bruce Frayne, Gary Minihan) DNS

Final
 (Emmit King, Willie Gault, Calvin Smith, Carl Lewis) 37.86 (WR)
 (Stefano Tilli, Carlo Simionato, Pierfrancesco Pavoni, Pietro Mennea) 38.37 (NR)
 (Andrey Prokofyev, Nikolay Sidorov, Vladimir Muravyov, Viktor Bryzgin) 38.41
 (Andreas Knebel, Thomas Schröder, Jens Hübler, Frank Emmelmann) 38.51
 (Werner Bastians, Christian Haas, Jürgen Evers, Andreas Rizzi) 38.56
 (Krzysztof Zwoliński, Zenon Licznerski, Czesław Prądzyński, Marian Woronin) 38.72
 (George Walcott, Ray Stewart, Leroy Reid, Colin Bradford) 38.75
 (Thierry Francois, Marc Gasparoni, Antoine Richard, Jean-Jacques Boussemart) 38.98

References
IAAF results, heats
IAAF results, semi-finals
IAAF results, final

4 x 400 metres relay men
Relays at the World Athletics Championships
4 × 100 metres relay